Diego Modrušan is a Croatian professional handball player. He won two Croatian Championships with Zagreb and the Italian Serie A with Handball Casarano. Modrušan play as a goalkeeper.

Career
He started playing handball at age thirteen. In 2000 he signed with RK Zagreb, where he won two consecutive titles and made his debut in the EHF Champions League. In 2002 he moved to Trieste. In the second part of the 2003–2004 season he passed on loan to Ascoli, with which he managed to avoid relegation. On his return to Trieste he won the only Handball Trophy in the history of the club, and reached the finale Scudetto (finals). In 2007 came the call of Italian champion Casarano, which made another important acquisition with Modrušan after Vito Fovio the year before. Modrušan won the Italian 2007/2008 Serie A with Casarano, as well as the Italian cup.

In the following season, he moved to Prato. Modrušan didn't end the season with Prato, because during the same season he moved to Emmeti. At the beginning of the 2009–2010 season he returned to Trieste and stayed there for three seasons. In 2012 he returned to Croatia after ten years, joining Umag. In 2016 he returned for the third and last time to Trieste.

He was in the Croatian national team that won the 2001 Mediterranean Games in Tunis. In 2008 he was called up by the Italian university team to compete in the world championship held in Oderzo and Meolo.

References

1980 births
Living people
Sportspeople from Pula
Croatian male handball players
Mediterranean Games gold medalists for Croatia
Mediterranean Games medalists in handball
Competitors at the 2001 Mediterranean Games
21st-century Croatian people